A letter scale is a weighing scale used for weighing letters in order to determine the correct amount of postage. Until the 1990s most letter scales were mechanical, but today electronic scales are the most common.

External links
Article Comparing and explaining letter scales
Article about post scales

Office equipment